Stanislav Govedarov (born November 13, 1980) is a former Bulgarian professional basketball player, who last played for BC Yambol in the Bulgarian League, as a shooting guard or point guard. He is well known as 'Mainata' among his team mates. Govedarov is born in Plovdiv and began his career in the local team - Academic Plovdiv. He was named the Chairman of the board of BC Yambol in August of 2021

References

 yambolbasketball.com profile
 basketball.bg profile
 eurobasket.com profile

1980 births
Living people
Sportspeople from Plovdiv
BC Yambol players
Bulgarian men's basketball players
Point guards
Shooting guards